The Multan Sultans is a franchise cricket team that represents Multan, Punjab, Pakistan in the Pakistan Super League. The team was founded in 2017 and made its PSL debut in the  2018 season.  They were one of the sixth team that competed in 2020 Pakistan Super League. The team was coached by Andy Flower, and captained by Shan Masood.

Squad
Players with international caps are shown in bold
Ages are given as of the first match of the season, 20 February 2020

Points table

League fixtures and results

Playoffs

Qualifier

Eliminator 2

Notes

References 

2020 in Punjab, Pakistan
2020 Pakistan Super League
Sultans in 2020
2020